The 107th Signal Battalion "Predil" is an inactive signals unit of the Italian Army. The battalion was formed in 1946 and assigned to the Infantry Division "Mantova". In 1975 the battalion was named for the Predil Pass and received the number 107th, which had been used by the 107th Teleradio Company that served with the Combat Group "Mantova" during the Italian campaign of World War II. With the name and number the battalion also received its own flag. In 1991 the battalion was disbanded and in 2002 reformed as the second signal battalion of the deployable 7th Signal Regiment.

History

World War II 

During World War II the 4th Engineer Regiment in Verona raised the 107th Mixed Telegraphers and Radio-Telegraphers Company, which was assigned to the 104th Infantry Division "Mantova". After allied forces had landed on the Italian peninsula and the Armistice of Cassibile between Italy and the Allies had been announced on 8 September 1943 the division remained loyal to King Victor Emmanuel III.

On 1 October 1944 the company was renamed 107th Teleradio Company and assigned to the CIV Mixed Engineer Battalion, which was formed in Cosenza for the Italian Co-Belligerent Army's Combat Group "Mantova". The battalion consisted of a command, the 79th Engineer Company and the 107th Teleradio Company. The battalion fought with the Combat Group "Mantova" on the allied side in the Italian campaign.

Cold War 

After the war the CIV Mixed Engineer Battalion was based in Albissola. On 6 September 1946 the battalion was split to form the Connections Battalion "Mantova" and the Engineer Battalion "Mantova", which were both assigned to the Infantry Division "Mantova". The Connections Battalion "Mantova" consisted of a command, a command platoon, and three connections companies - one for division headquarter, one for infantry regiment, and one for artillery regiment. In 1947 the battalion moved from Albissola to Tricesimo and in 1949 from Tricesimo to Udine.

On 1 October 1952 the Connections Speciality became an autonomous speciality of the Engineer Arm, with its own school and gorget patches. On 16 May 1953 the speciality adopted the name Signal Speciality and consequently the Connections Battalion "Mantova" was renamed Signal Battalion "Mantova" on 1 June 1953. On 1 April 1954 the battalion was reduced to a company consisting of a command, a command platoon, two Marconists platoons, a signal center platoon, and a phone signals platoon. On 5 December 1958 the company was again expanded to battalion and now consisted of a command, a command platoon, and two signal companies.

During the 1975 army reform the army disbanded the regimental level and newly independent battalions were granted for the first time their own flags. During the reform signal battalions were renamed for mountain passes. On 1 January 1976 the Signal Battalion "Mantova" was renamed 107th Signal Battalion "Predil" and assigned to the Mechanized Division "Folgore". After the reform the battalion consisted of a command, a command and services platoon, two signal companies, and a repairs and recovery platoon. On 12 November 1976 the battalion was granted a flag by decree 846 of the President of the Italian Republic Giovanni Leone.

For its conduct and work after the 1976 Friuli earthquake the battalion was awarded a Bronze Medal of Army Valour, which was affixed to the battalion's flag.

In 1986 the Mechanized Division "Mantova was disbanded and therefore on 1 July 1986 the battalion was transferred to the 5th Army Corps' Signal Command. On 1 June 1989 the battalion was reorganized and now consisted of a command, a command and services company, the 1st and 2nd radio relay companies, and the 3rd Signal Center Company.

With the end of the Cold War the Italian Army began to draw down its forces and on 30 September 1991 the battalion was disbanded. On 5 December 1991 the flag of the 107th Signal Battalion "Predil" was transferred to the Shrine of the Flags in the Vittoriano in Rome.

Recent times 
On 8 January 2002 the battalion was reformed as Battalion "Predil" and assigned to the 7th Signal Regiment as the regiment's second signal battalion.

References

Signal Regiments of Italy